Holly Morgan (born 10 February 1993, Leicester, United Kingdom) is a former professional association footballer who played as a defender. Her one and only team were FA Women's Super League's Leicester City. She joined Leicester in 2004 at the age of 11 and she has been a one club woman sinc,apart from playing with River City Ladies 2022/23 Season.

Her brother Jonathan is the former manager of Leicester Reserves and the first team. Her father Rohan, is the chairman, and her sister, Jade, is the general manager. She is a qualified solicitor and has completed the London Marathon.

On 20 July 2021, Morgan retired after 17 years playing for Leicester City to take up a coaching role with the club. She left Leicester on 25 November, after her brother was sacked as team manager.

Honours

League
 FA Women's Championship (1) 2020-21
 FA Women's Midlands Division One (1): 2015-16

Cups
 Midlands Combination League Cup
 Leicestershire & Rutland County FA Cup (4): 2017–18, 2013–14, 2011–12, 2010–11

References

External links

1993 births
Living people
Footballers from Leicester
English women's footballers
Women's association football defenders
Leicester City W.F.C. players